Caliban upon Setebos is a poem written by the British poet Robert Browning and published in his 1864 Dramatis Personae collection. It deals with Caliban, a character from Shakespeare's The Tempest, and his reflections on Setebos, the brutal god believed in by himself and his late mother Sycorax. Some scholars see Browning as being of the belief that God is in the eye of the beholder, and this is emphasized by a barbaric character believing in a barbaric god. An offshoot of this interpretation is the argument that Browning is applying evolutionary theory to religious development. Others feel that he was satirizing theologians of his time, who attempted to understand God as a reflection of themselves; this theory is supported by the epigraph, Psalm 50:21, "Thou thoughtest that I was altogether such a one as thyself." This could be taken as God mocking Caliban (and Browning's contemporaries) for their methods of attempting to understand Him (see note at the bottom of ).

Excerpt
The poem begins (text in [brackets]) with a brief narration, but quickly moves to Caliban's monologue, in which he contemplates his god:

Citations

References
Tracy, C.R. (1938). "Caliban Upon Setebos". Studies in Philology 35 (3): 487–499.
Tebbetts, T.L. (1984). "The Question of Satire in 'Caliban Upon Setebos". Victorian Poetry 22 (4): 365–381.

External links

 Sparknote's study guide of the poem
 The text of the poem at Representative Poetry Online

Poetry by Robert Browning
1864 poems
Works based on The Tempest